The Global Stadium Tour is an ongoing concert tour by American rock band Red Hot Chili Peppers in support of the band's twelfth and thirteenth studio albums, Unlimited Love and Return of the Dream Canteen, which were released on April 1, 2022, and October 14, 2022, respectively. The tour is the band's first in five years and their first in fifteen years with guitarist John Frusciante, who returned to the band in 2019. The tour began in Seville, Spain, in June 2022 and is tentatively scheduled to conclude in November 2023 in Porto Alegre, Brazil. Its the band's biggest and most commercially successful tour of their career.

Global Stadium Tour
On September 24, 2021, the band announced that they would embark on a world tour in 2022, their first with John Frusciante since 2007 and that it would be in support of their as yet to be announced twelfth studio album. The band made the announcement in a YouTube video where they dressed as newscasters for a fictional news channel called KHOT News. Anthony Kiedis played a character called Johnson Hammerswaddle, Flea played Todd the Squirrel, while Chad Smith played weatherman Randy Raindrops. John Frusciante appeared as himself being interviewed by the other three band members. On October 7, 2021, the band released another KHOT News video, where they confirmed the first 32 dates for their Global Stadium Tour which would see the band performing their first North American headlining stadium shows in their career. Presales for the shows began on October 9.

"Can't Stop" and "Around the World" have alternated as the band's opening songs (following an intro jam) for nearly the entire tour however "Eddie" and "Fake as Fu@k" have opened some shows. For the first two legs, "By the Way" served as the band's closing song for their shows. The closing slot was typically held for many years by "Give it Away", which was now ending the main set. When the tour resumed for the third leg in January 2023, "Give it Away" was back to closing out the shows with "By the Way" returning to its main set closing spot. This tour has seen the band drop "Under the Bridge" from many of their setlists. The song has been written on various setlists but either dropped in favor of another song (typically "I Could Have Lied", "Soul to Squeeze" or "Sir Pyscho Sexy") or not replaced by any song.

Pre-tour promotional shows and performances
On April 1, 2022, the release date for Unlimited Love, the Chili Peppers performed a surprise show at The Fonda Theatre in Los Angeles. It marked the band's first show since 2007 with Frusciante 
(although they did perform a three-song set, minus Chad Smith, on February 8, 2020, at a memorial service for a friend). The show saw the live debuts of "Here Ever After", "Aquatic Mouth Dance" and "Not the One" from Unlimited Love and George Clinton joined the band for "Give It Away". On the same day, the band appeared in pre-recorded performances (filmed on March 29 and 31) on The Tonight Show Starring Jimmy Fallon where "Black Summer" made its live debut and on Jimmy Kimmel Live!, where they performed "These Are the Ways" for the first time on the rooftop of The Hollywood Roosevelt hotel where the album cover and photos were shot, On April 5, they appeared on The Howard Stern Show where they were interviewed and performed "These Are the Ways" along with two handpicked songs by Howard Stern, "Give It Away" and "Under the Bridge".

On April 7, they gave a special four song performance (with Frusciante on acoustic guitar) at Amoeba Music in Hollywood, CA. The performance included a cover of Black Flag's "Nervous Breakdown" which was last performed by the band in 2016. The band gave a surprise invite-only performance on April 14 at the Yaamava' Theater in Highland, CA, for the opening of the Yaamava' Resort & Casino. They were the first to ever perform at the theater. This performance saw the live debut of "Whatchu Thinkin'". On May 1, the band performed at the New Orleans Jazz & Heritage Festival, replacing the Foo Fighters who cancelled their appearance following the death of drummer Taylor Hawkins. The band closed the show with "By the Way" marking the first time the song closed a show since 2007. While the band was scheduled to perform at the Billboard Music Awards on May 15, it was later announced on May 11 that, due to “unseen circumstances”, the band was forced to cancel their appearance at the awards show.
SiriusXM launched the Whole Lotta Red Hot channel on April 1, and it was announced that an exclusive concert for subscribers would air on the channel later in the year.

European leg
The band kicked off their Global Stadium Tour in Seville on June 4, 2022. It marked the band's first tour with Frusciante since their Stadium Arcadium World Tour in 2006–07 and their first ever show in Seville. The setlist consists of 17 songs with the shows lasting under two hours, which has been common for the band throughout their career. On June 7, 2022, the band performed in Barcelona where the setlist saw a drastic change from the first night. "The Heavy Wing" from Unlimited Love made its live debut, while songs including "Around the World" "Dani California", "I Could Have Lied" and "Right on Time" were performed with Frusicante for the first time in over 15 years. At the band's June 10 show in the Netherlands, "One Way Traffic" from Unlimited Love made its live debut while "Hard to Concentrate" from 2006's Stadium Arcadium was performed for the first time with Frusciante and "I Like Dirt" from 1999's Californication was performed for the first time since 2004 with Frusciante. On June 12, the band performed in Bratislava, Slovakia at the Lovestream Festival where "She's a Lover" and "White Braids & Pillow Chair" from Unlimited Love made their live debut along with "Me and My Friends" making its tour debut. "Thirty Dirty Birds", a short spoken-word song from 1985's Freaky Styley, was recited by Flea during the show. It marked the first time since 1991 it had been performed. At their June 15 show in Budapest, "It's Only Natural" from Unlimited Love made its live debut, while "Don't Forget Me" made its tour debut.

"Universally Speaking" was performed for the first time since 2004 with Frusciante at the band's June 22 show in Manchester. Under the Bridge finally made its return on June 25 in London after being dropped from previous shows. That same show,  "Emit Remmus" also made its tour debut. On June 29 in Dublin, "If You Have to Ask", "Sir Psycho Sexy" and "They're Red Hot" from  their 1991 album Blood Sugar Sex Magik made their tour debuts. The band announced that they had to cancel their July 1 show in Glasgow due to an illness and said they are working on ways to reschedule the show.

North American leg
The band kicked off the North American leg of their tour on July 23, 2022, in Denver, Colorado. During the show, the band announced that their 13th studio album, Return of the Dream Canteen, would be released on October 14, 2022. The band's July 29, 2022, show in Santa Clara saw the tour debut of the rarely performed "She's Only 18", which was last performed in 2017, and on the August 6, 2022 in Las Vegas saw the tour debut of "Blood Sugar Sex Magik".  "Strip My Mind" made its tour debut in Nashville on August 12. The band performed "Black Summer" and "Can't Stop" the 2022 MTV Video Music Awards on August 28 where received the Global Icon Award, presented to them by Cheech & Chong, and also won the award for Best Rock Video for "Black Summer". The band performed a special show at The Apollo Theater in New York on September 13, 2022, as part of the SiriusXM Small Stage Series. The show was broadcast live on the band's SiriusXM channel Whole Lotta Red Hot and fans could win tickets by listening to the channel. The band's show on September 15, 2022 in Orlando was delayed for over an hour due to a rainstorm. During the show, John Frusciante performed "I Remember You" by the Ramones to pay tribute to his late friend Johnny Ramone who had died 18 years earlier on that date. The North American leg of the stadium tour wrapped up on September 18, 2022 in Arlington, Texas. Festival performances will conclude the remainder of the North America dates in 2022.

On October 9, "Eddie" made its live debut at the Austin City Limits Music Festival. It was the first performance of a song from Return of the Dream Canteen. On October 12, the band made a surprise appearance at Hoopa Valley High School in Hoopa, California, where they performed twelve songs for the students during the school's Indigenous Peoples' Day assembly.The band performed their final show of 2022 at the Silverlake Conservatory of Music on October 29. The show was dedicated to the band's former drummer D.H. Peligro who died the previous day. The band performed their first show of 2023 on January 14 at the iHeartRadio ALTer Ego music festival in Inglewood, California, where "Fake as Fu@k" (the show's opening song), "The Drummer" and "Tippa My Tongue" made their live debuts.

Oceania leg
The tour resumed on January 21, 2023, with eight dates in New Zealand and Australia, with Post Malone serving as the opening act. Unlike with the previous legs of the tour, "Give it Away" is now closing out the band's encore and "By the Way" is closing out the main set. "Reach Out" made its live debut on January 26, 2023, in New Zealand. "Carry Me Home" made its live debut on February 4, 2023, in Australia.

Asian leg
The band performed their first shows on the tour in Asia, with three dates scheduled for February 16, 19 and 21, 2023 in Singapore and Japan. For the first time on the tour, "Around the World" appeared late in the band's set during their February 16 show in Singapore. The song has been alternated with "Can't Stop" as the band's opening song for the entire tour. "Fake as Fu@k" opened the show for only the second time on the tour.

North American leg II
A second North American leg of the tour is currently scheduled for eleven shows and will begin in March 2023 in Mexico City and will conclude on May 28, 2023 in Napa, California, at the BottleRock Napa Valley festival. City and Colour, The Mars Volta, The Strokes, Thundercat, St. Vincent, and King Princess will serve as opening acts.

European leg II
A thirteen date second European leg will begin on June 18, 2023 in the Netherlands and will wrap up on July 23 in Glasgow. Iggy Pop, The Roots and King Princess will serve as the opening acts. The leg will also consist of seven festival dates.

South American leg
A South American leg was announced in March 2023 for Brazil and will consist of five shows starting on November 4 in Rio de Janeiro and wrapping up on November 16 in Porto Alegre.

Songs performed

Originals/songs recorded by the band

Cover songs (teases and jams unless otherwise noted)

Tour dates

Cancelled dates

Opening/support acts
 Irontom (April 1, 2022)
 Beck (June 4, 2022, July 29, 31 2022)
 Thundercat (June 4 – July 9, 2022, July 23 – August 3, 2022, August 10 – September 18, 2022, May 12-25, 2023)
 Nas (June 7, 10, 15, 2022)
 A$AP Rocky (June 22, 26, 2022, July 5, 12, 2022)
 Anderson Paak & Free Nationals (June 25, 29 2022, July 8-9, 2022)
 Haim  (July 23, 27, 2022)
 The Strokes (August 3–21, 2022, August 30 – September 8, 2022, September 15, 18, 2022, April 6–14, 2023, May 14, 17, 29, 2023)
 King Princess (August 6, 2022, March 29 – April 14, 2023, July 11, 14, 21, 23, 2023)
 St. Vincent (September 10, 2022, April 1, 2023)
 Post Malone (January 21 – February 12, 2023)
 City and Colour (March 29, 2023)
 The Mars Volta (May 12, 2023)
 Iggy Pop (June 21, 26, 2023, July 11, 14, 2023)
 The Roots (July 21, 23, 2023)

Personnel
Flea – bass, backing vocals, lead vocals (on "Pea")
Anthony Kiedis – lead vocals
John Frusciante – guitar, backing vocals, co-lead vocals (on "The Heavy Wing")
Chad Smith – drums, percussion

 Additional musicians
Chris Warren – keyboards, drum synthesizer, percussion

Notes

External links
RHCP Live Archive
Red Hot Chili Peppers

References 

2022 concert tours
2023 concert tours
Red Hot Chili Peppers concert tours
Concert tours of Europe